is a Japanese footballer currently playing as a midfielder for Albirex Niigata (S).

Career statistics

Club
.

Notes

References

2001 births
Living people
Association football people from Shizuoka Prefecture
Japanese footballers
Japanese expatriate footballers
Association football midfielders
Singapore Premier League players
Japan Soccer College players
Albirex Niigata Singapore FC players
Japanese expatriate sportspeople in Singapore
Expatriate footballers in Singapore